PopCultured is a Canadian television talk show, which aired on The Comedy Network in 2005 and 2006. The program featured stand-up comedian Elvira Kurt and other cast members poking fun at celebrities in the context of a mock newscast similar to The Daily Show with Jon Stewart, with one interview guest at the centre of each episode.

The show began airing in April 2005.

The show was widely panned by critics, and was canceled after one season, in early 2006, due to poor ratings.

References

External links
 

2005 Canadian television series debuts
2006 Canadian television series endings
CTV Comedy Channel original programming
2000s Canadian comedy television series
2000s Canadian television talk shows